Orobanche uniflora, commonly known as one-flowered broomrape, one-flowered cancer root, ghost pipe or naked broomrape, is an annual parasitic herbaceous plant. It is native to much of North America, where it is a parasitic plant, tapping nutrients from many other species of plants, including those in the families Asteraceae and Saxifragaceae and in the genus Sedum. The name "orobanche" can be translated to "vetch-strangler" and "uniflora" can be translated to "single-flower".

Description
The corolla is two-lipped, finely fringed with five similar lobes. The main stem is under the ground, with only the pedicels being seen and each pedicel containing only one flower. The stems are grayish tan. No leaves are on the plant or offshoot from it. It reproduces from its seeds, which are produced from fruit that has two sections. Many seeds are produced from the plant's fruit.

The plant is parasitic, feeding off of other plants' root systems, often on the flowering plant genus Sedum which are also known as stonecrops. It does not produce chlorophyll, rather gaining its nutrients, such as carbohydrates, from other plant species. Due to not producing chlorophyll, the plant does not produce any green portions. It is not agreed upon by botanists whether the plant's flowers are pollinated by insects or if they are pollinated by the plant itself. The life expectancy of the species is unknown.

The species closely resembles Orobanche fasciculata. The two can be differentiated by their bracts and number of flowers. The bract looks like a small leaf and is found at the junction of where each flower stalk is attached to the underground stem. O. uniflora's bracts are hairless while O. fasciculata's bracts are hairy. The flowers of O. uniflora have one to three flowers on each stem branch while O. fasciculata has three to ten flowers per stem branch. O. fasciculata has flowers that are pinkish to creamy-white, unlike O. uniflora which is tinged with violet.

Habitat
The plant can be found in woods, thickets, and mountains as well as by stream banks, and is widespread in much of North America. Unlike other species in the genus Orobanche, Oranbanche uniflora is largely a species that can be commonly found in forests. The species has been found surviving in both the sunlight and shaded areas, as well as in a variety of different types of soil. Its habitat is restricted to places where there are plenty of host plants. It might be difficult for this species to survive in an area where its host plants are sparsely found.

A specimen is contained within the botany department of the Smithsonian National Museum of Natural History and another specimen has been photographed at Hells Canyon National Recreation Area. It is considered rare or vulnerable in 17 states and five Canadian provinces. The species was identified as being of Special Concern in Minnesota in 1984 and was changed to endangered in 2013. When it was originally listed as a Special Concern in Minnesota, only seven populations were known to exist.

References

External links

 E-Flora BC
 Jepson Manual Treatment
 USDA Plants Profile
 Photo gallery

uniflora
Parasitic plants
Flora of North America
Plants described in 1753
Taxa named by Carl Linnaeus